A number of steamships were named Noyo, including:

, an American cargo ship wrecked in 1935
, an American cargo ship in service 1935–40

Ship names